is a Japanese  manga series written and illustrated by Akimine Kamijyo. Set during the Edo period of Japan's history, Samurai Deeper Kyo follows , a feared samurai seeking to regain his body after his soul is sealed inside the body of his rival, Mibu Kyoshiro. Kyo is joined in his search by the bounty-hunter Shiina Yuya, the heir to the Tokugawa shogunate Benitora; and Sanada Yukimura, a known rival of the Tokugawa.

Samurai Deeper Kyo was serialized from May 26, 1999 to May 10, 2006 in Kodansha's Weekly Shōnen Magazine, and collected over 38 volumes. The manga was adapted into an animated television series in 2002. The Studio Deen production aired on TV Tokyo from July to December 2002, for a total of 26 episodes. Both the manga and anime have been licensed in the United States, Canada, and the United Kingdom. The manga was acquired by Tokyopop in 2002. However, by 2009, Kodansha allowed its licensing contracts to expire, preventing Tokyopop from continuing the English version of the series. Samurai Deeper Kyo was shortly thereafter picked up by Del Rey Manga, who have completed the series by releasing volumes 35 and 36 in a single volume and volumes 37 and 38 in a single volume. The anime series was acquired by Media Blasters under its AnimeWorks label in 2003. briefly aired on Encore Action and Starz WAM! in the United States.

Plot

Set in Tokugawa Japan, this manga begins by following Shiina Yuya, a bounty hunter searching for her brother's murderer. However, Yuya quickly meets a medicine peddler named Mibu Kyoshiro, who turns out to be sharing a body with the feared samurai Demon Eyes Kyo. Over time, Mibu Kyoshiro and, to a lesser extent, Shiina Yuya recede from the story while Demon Eyes Kyo comes to the fore. Kyo's only stated wish is to regain his own body. Following this path leads Kyo, Yuya and a variety of fellow travelers into conflict with both the Tokugawa shogunate and the Mibu tribe, a race of violent superhumans who have run Japan from the shadows for millennia.

Underlying the principal story arc of Kyo's search to reclaim his body, there are many smaller arcs, each leading to the next one. The basis of many later revelations are established many volumes in advance. In the manga, it is revealed that all of the Mibu, except for Kyo, are descendants of "Battle Dolls", creatures created by the Mibu to fight for their amusement. In time, the Battle Dolls come to believe they were the real Mibu, and that the real Mibu eventually became extinct due to in-fighting. The Mibu Battle Dolls are gradually being killed by the "Death Disease". Muramasa's sister was the first to be killed by the disease, but others soon followed. The disease manifests itself when the infected person reaches a certain age. For this reason, the aging process has been stopped in Antera, Tokito, and probably others.

Demon Eyes Kyo ultimately defeats the father and creator of the Mibu, the Former Crimson King, who was also the very first Battle Doll. Originally an extremely beloved and thoroughly benevolent ruler, the King had become totally corrupted by his loss of all faith in humanity, and became an insane tyrant bent on completely eradicating all of mankind. Kyo then goes missing-in-action after the final battle, which blows up the Mibu capital. Kyo shows up at the end of the penultimate chapter being called upon by his sword tenro. In the bonus chapter which contains no dialogue shows Kyo and Yuya living in a house together.

Characters

He is known for his demonic blood-red eyes and is one of the most feared samurai in the world. He carries a legendary ōdachi called Tenro (Heavenly Wolf), made by mastersmith Muramasa. In the manga, he is depicted as a cold, unbeatable samurai. When he was young, he was shunned by all of the Mibu clan for his demonic red eyes except for the Sendai Aka no Ou (Former Crimson King). After killing Oda Nobunaga, he was thrown into the Mibu dungeons until Muramasa rescued him and trained him in Mumyo Jinpu Ryuu. Kyo is the last remaining True Mibu. Sendai Aka no Ou asked Kyo to seek out the outside world and one day stop the former King himself if he was to become evil and destroy the world.

A remarkable and mysterious swordsman, depicted as the only rival to Demon Eyes Kyo. He wielded the Shibien (Black Sword), one of the Muramasa weapons. In the manga, he is depicted as one of the heirs to the Aka no Ou throne, the Red Eyes being proof of his Mibu lineage. He is a "Red Cross Knight", created from the flesh of the Sendai Aka no Ou. Though he is able to control the Red Eyes, he is not a true Mibu, but merely a more powerful battle doll resembling the first generation of battle dolls created. It is depicted that he is stronger than Demon Eyes Kyo until near the end of the manga.

A young woman who makes a living as a professional bounty hunter in order to track down her brother's killer, the "Man with the Scar on His Back". She uses a three barreled gun and small daggers as defensive weapons. Yuya is actually an orphan found by her "brother", Nozomu, and raised by him as an adoptive sister. He was Sakuya's biological brother. Unlike many of the characters, Yuya is a normal human without any powers, despite the former Crimson King suspecting she can see the future later in the story.

He is also known as "The Shadow Master" due to his ability to make multiple copies of himself. He first appeared in volume 2 of the manga, accompanying White Crow. He later challenges Kyoshiro, who he thought was Kyo, to a fight. Benitora loses and decides to join their group.
He immediately takes a romantic interest in Shiina Yuya, although the feeling is not returned. Note: Benitora translates to 'Red Tiger'.

A famous general who lost the battle of Sekigahara and ultimately Japan. He escaped Kudoyama and planned the assassination of Tokugawa Ieyasu, though it was never carried out. Yukimura travels with Kyo in order to defeat the Mibu Clan and Oda Nobunaga. In doing so, this would free Japan from the Mibu Clan's shadow governing and give Yukimura a chance at taking over Japan.

Ruled by The Crimson King. Most of their members are humanoid in appearance but have very long lives compared to humans and have great strength and power. The lower ranked Mibu are sometimes in humanoid shape with abnormal bodies, i.e. three eyes or clawed hands. These were created by experiments on humans and animals to replenish the clan, because natural childbirth has stopped in the Mibu clan for unknown reasons. The Mibu clan are said to possess the most advanced knowledge in sciences and technology and have been manipulating the country's history from the shadows by helping the Shoguns. They decide to rule the country directly when Ieyasu Tokugawa becomes the first shogun to ever rebel against their power.
All of the current Mibu are battle dolls made by True Mibu, except for Demon Eyes Kyo, the last remaining True Mibu. But as generations passed, True Mibu started engaging in civil wars to seek greater power, which ended up in the destruction of their very clan with only battle dolls remaining. Present Mibu are dying off due to the Death Disease which is caused by their flaw as battle dolls created by True Mibu. Kyoshiro and Chinmei are also battle dolls, but a more powerful version created by the first generation battle doll, the former Aka no Ou. They are called "sons of the God", and have limited power compared to what a True Mibu has. Eventually, they will also inherit Death Disease and die.

Anime adaptation
The TV adaptation takes extreme liberties with the plot, and only vaguely follows the plot of the manga. Kyo is an artificial construct, born of Kyoshiro's attempt to purge violence and cruelty from himself i.e. Kyo is the dark half of Kyoshiro's soul in a Mibu-made homunculus. While Kyo is resealed inside Kyoshiro after losing a sword fight to him, the circumstances behind it are different. Kyoshiro confronts Kyo at the Battle of Sekigahara in order to stop his bloody rampage, rather than to protect Sakuya. Apart from these and flashbacks to his time with Muramasa, Akira and Hotaru, the anime provides fewer details of Kyo's past. The character of Yuya is often relegated to a peripheral character, while the role of the kenyou is enhanced.

Episodes

Music
Opening Theme:
"Aoi no Requiem (Blue Requiem)" by Pipeline Project featuring Yuiko Tsubokura

Ending Theme:
"Love Deeper" by Pipeline Project featuring Yuiko Tsubokura

Character songs (from Samurai Deeper Kyo Vocal Album Kyousouka):
"Arboreus Mare" by DRY
"PAX VOBISCUM -Negawaku wa Heian Najira to Tomo ni-" by Hikaru Midorikawa (Migeira)
"Hanadoki" by Megumi Ogata (Yukimura Sanada)
"Kisugi Kanyou no Koto" by Toshihiko Seki (Benitora)
"Aosusuki" by Yui Horie (Yuya Shina)
"Kohikoro mo" by Yumi Kakazu (Okuni Izumono)
"Koran" by Katsuyuki Konishi (Onime no Kyo)
"Ashikabi" by Souichirou Hoshi (Akira)
"Zessou" by Tomokazu Seki (Shinrei)
"Youryuu Risui" by Megumi Ogata (Yukimura Sanada)
"Dokumyoufuu" by Takehito Koyasu (Hotaru)
"Kinen" by Katsuyuki Konishi (Kyoshiro Mibu)

Video games
Two video games based on Samurai Deeper Kyo have been published by Bandai. The first, a versus fighting game for the PlayStation, was released in Japan on December 12, 2002. Alongside the regular edition of the game, Bandai released a "Limited Edition" bundled with a Samurai Deeper Kyo collectible card game. The second, an action-adventure game for the Game Boy Advance (GBA), was developed by Marvelous Entertainment and released in Japan on December 27, 2002. This game was later localized for North America by Destineer and bundled with a re-release of the anime series box set in 2008. Released on February 12, 2008, It was the last game to be released for the GBA before the system’s discontinuation in North America on May 15, 2010.

Kyo is a playable character in the 2009 fighting game Sunday vs Magazine: Shūketsu! Chōjō Daikessen, released by Konami for the PlayStation Portable.

References

External links
 Samurai Deeper Kyo at Weekly Shōnen Magazine 
 Samurai Deeper Kyo at Tokyopop's website
 Samurai Deeper Kyo anime official website
 Samurai Deeper Kyo (vocal album) at Starchild Records 
 Samurai Deeper Kyo video game at Bandai Games 
 

1999 manga
2002 anime television series debuts
Adventure anime and manga
Anime Works
Del Rey Manga
Films with screenplays by Shō Aikawa
Game Boy Advance games
Kodansha manga
Martial arts anime and manga
PlayStation (console) games
Samurai in anime and manga
Shōnen manga
Studio Deen
Tokyopop titles
TV Tokyo original programming